This is a list of mayors of Oxnard, California.

The City's first mayor was Richard B. Haydock who led the effort to build the city's Carnegie library, now known as the Carnegie Art Museum.

The City's longest-serving mayor was Manuel M. Lopez who was mayor for 12 years from 1992 to 2004.

The current mayor is John C. Zaragoza, a former Ventura County Supervisor and Oxnard City Council member who has held the office since 2020.

References

Oxnard
Mayors